Kristóf Tóth-Gábor (born 11 September 2001) is a Hungarian professional footballer who plays for Pécs.

Club career
On 12 August 2021, Tóth-Gábor returned to Haladás on a season-long loan.

On 7 July 2022, Tóth-Gábor signed with Pécs.

Career statistics
.

References

External links

2001 births
People from Nagykanizsa
Sportspeople from Zala County
21st-century Hungarian people
Living people
Hungarian footballers
Association football forwards
Hungary youth international footballers
Hungary under-21 international footballers
Szombathelyi Haladás footballers
Budapest Honvéd FC players
Budapest Honvéd FC II players
Kazincbarcikai SC footballers
Pécsi MFC players
Nemzeti Bajnokság I players
Nemzeti Bajnokság II players
Nemzeti Bajnokság III players